The 1979 Trans-Am Series was the fourteenth running of the Sports Car Club of America's premier series. All races except for the Six Hours of Watkins Glen ran for approximately one hundred miles. For the first time in series history, the schedule included a round held outside the United States and Canada, with the first round being contested in Mexico.

Results

‡ - The Watkins Glen Six Hours was a round of the World Championship for Makes. Overall winner was an FIA Group 5 Porsche 935.

References

Trans-Am Series
Trans-Am